East Hanover Township may refer to the following townships in the United States:

 East Hanover Township, New Jersey, in Morris County
 East Hanover Township, Dauphin County, Pennsylvania
 East Hanover Township, Lebanon County, Pennsylvania